HMS Osprey was an Osprey-class sloop built for the Royal Navy in the mid-1870s.

References

Bibliography

 

Osprey-class sloops
Ships built in Sheerness
1876 ships
Victorian-era sloops of the United Kingdom